Marc-Hyacinthe de Rosmadec ( – 14 May 1702) was a French naval officer who was appointed governor general of the French Antilles but died before taking office.

Family

Marc-Hyacinthe de Rosmadec was the second son of Sébastien de Rosmadec, marquis de Rosmadec and seigneur du Plexis-Josso, and of Julienne Bonnier.
His older brother Sébastien II (1626-78) was marquis du Plessis. Sébastien II's son was Sébastien III (born 1661), Comte de Rosmadec.

Career

Rosmadec joined the navy and was named lieutenant de vaisseau in 1666, then capitaine de vaisseau in 1671.
He served with distinction in actions in Sicily and the English Channel.
From 3 October 1677 to 11 May 1678 Marc-Hyacinthe Rosmadec, Chevalier de Tréguier, was captain of the 64-gun Bourbon.
In 1689 he was in command of the 56-gun Fort (formerly L'Ecueil).
He served in the Fort in the Battle of Bantry Bay on 11 May 1689.

In 1690 Rosmadec acquired the Château de Rocheux and its  estate from the Rochechouart family.
On 6 February 1694 the chevalier de Rosmadec, capitaine de vaisseau, was made a chevalier of the Order of Saint Louis.
He was given this reward after 25 years of service.
On 13 April 1697 he was appointed squadron commander.

Appointment as governor general

The governor general of the Antilles Charles Desnotz died on 6 October 1701, and Charles de Pechpeyrou-Comminges de Guitaut was appointed interim governor general of the Antilles.
Marc-Hyacinthe de Rosmadec was appointed to succeed Charles d'Esnos as governor general of the French Antilles on 4 January 1702.
Marc-Hyacinthe died in Havana, Cuba on 14 May 1702.
He died before taking up his post.
His heir was Gabriel-Sébastien de Rosmadec, comte de Rocheux.
Guitaud died on 7 September 1702 and was replaced as interim governor by Nicolas de Gabaret.
Finally, Charles-François de Machault de Belmont took office in Martinique on 4 March 1703.

Notes

Sources

  

1635 births
1702 deaths
Governors general of the French Antilles